Team SEB (also RS) is a Swedish Volvo Ocean 60 yacht.

Career
She competed in the 2001–02 Volvo Ocean Race and finished 7th skippered by Gunnar Krantz.

The boat was renamed RS and participated in the 2003 Volvo Baltic Race skippered by Erle Williams. RS won the competition.

References

Sailing yachts of Sweden
Volvo Ocean 60 yachts
Volvo Ocean Race yachts
2000s sailing yachts